Jukka Loikas (born 17 August 1966) is a Finnish wrestler. He competed in the men's Greco-Roman 62 kg at the 1988 Summer Olympics.

References

1966 births
Living people
Finnish male sport wrestlers
Olympic wrestlers of Finland
Wrestlers at the 1988 Summer Olympics
Sportspeople from Helsinki